Pseudoacontias unicolor is a species of lizard which is endemic to Madagascar.

References

unicolor
Reptiles of Madagascar
Reptiles described in 2003
Taxa named by Tsutomu Hikida